Emmet Derby Boyle (July 26, 1879 – January 3, 1926) was an American politician. He was the 13th Governor of Nevada. He was a member of the Democratic Party.

Biography
Boyle was born on July 26, 1879, in Gold Hill, Nevada, making him the first governor of Nevada to be born in the state. He was a mining engineer, and was the Governor of Nevada from 1915 to 1923. He also served as president of the Reno Chamber of Commerce.

As governor, he gained prominence for his opposition to boxing.   In 1918, he refused to allow Fred Fulton and Jess Willard to fight in the state.

After retiring as governor, he served as publisher of the Nevada State Journal.

Boyle died on January 3, 1926, in Reno, Nevada, at the age of 46.

References

External links
 
A Guide to the Emmet Derby Boyle Papers, 88-02. Special Collections, University Libraries, University of Nevada, Reno.
A Guide to the Emmet Derby Boyle Scrapbooks, NC09. Special Collections, University Libraries, University of Nevada, Reno.

1879 births
1926 deaths
Democratic Party governors of Nevada
American mining engineers
Politicians from Reno, Nevada